Little Miss Nobody is a 1933 British comedy film directed by John Daumery, and starring Sebastian Shaw, Drusilla Wills, and Betty Huntley-Wright. The film was a quota quickie made at Teddington Studios by the British subsidiary of Warner Brothers.

Plot summary
A Danish actress working on the London stage earns a film contract.

Cast
 Winna Winifried as Karen Bergen
 Sebastian Shaw as Pat Carey
 Betty Huntley-Wright as Tilly
 A. Bromley Davenport as Mr. Romary
 Drusilla Wills as Birdie May
 Ben Field as Sam Brightwell
 Ernest Sefton as Mr. Morrison
 Abraham Sofaer as Mr. Beal

References

Bibliography
Chibnall, Steve. Quota Quickies: The Birth of the British 'B' Film. British Film Institute, 2007.
Low, Rachael. Filmmaking in 1930s Britain. George Allen & Unwin, 1985.
Wood, Linda. British Films, 1927–1939. British Film Institute, 1986.

External links

1933 films
British comedy films
Warner Bros. films
1933 comedy films
Films directed by Jean Daumery
Films shot at Teddington Studios
Films set in London
British black-and-white films
1930s English-language films
1930s British films
Quota quickies
English-language comedy films